Ellen Elias-Bursać (born 1952) is an American scholar and literary translator. Specializing in South Slavic literature, she has translated numerous works from Bosnian, Croatian, and Serbian.

Early life
Ellen Elias was born in Cambridge, Massachusetts. Her parents were Peter and Marjorie (née Forbes) Elias. She has two brothers. Her aunt was Barbara Elias, a poet.

She studied at the Commonwealth School in Boston, graduating in 1970. She attended Macalester College, receiving a Bachelor of Arts degree in Russian literature and language in 1974.

During her undergraduate studies, she attended a study abroad programme in Yugoslavia. She worked as a freelance translator, and studied towards a master's degree at the University of Zagreb.

In 1999, she received a PhD from University of Zagreb in philology; her dissertation was titled Augustina-Tina Ujevića prijevodi iz anglo-američke književnosti: komparativno/kontrastivna lingvo-stilistička analiza.

Career
Elias-Bursać worked as a language preceptor in the Slavic department of Harvard University for 10 years. In 2005, she joined the English Translation Unit of the International Criminal Tribunal for the former Yugoslavia (ICTY), in The Hague. Since leaving the ICTY she has been working as a free-lance translator, an independent scholar, and a contributing editor to Asymptote. She is a past president of the American Literary Translators Association.

Works

Translations
 From Bosnian
 
 
 

 From Croatian

 
 
 
 
 
 
 
 
  with David Williams

 From Serbian

Other publications
  (With Svetlana Broz and Laurie Kain Hart)
  (With Ronelle Alexander)

Awards
In 1998, Elias-Bursać received the AATSEEL Award for best translation from a Slavic or East European language for David Albahari's Words are Something Else. In 2006, she was given the National Translation Award for Albahari's Götz and Meyer. Her translation of Trieste by Daša Drndić won the Independent Foreign Fiction Readers' Prize in 2013.

The Association for Women in Slavic Studies recognized Translating Evidence and Interpreting Testimony at a War Crimes Tribunal: Working in a Tug-of-War with the Mary Zirin Prize in 2015.

References

1952 births
Living people
Macalester College alumni
American translators
Serbian–English translators
People from Cambridge, Massachusetts
American women writers
Commonwealth School alumni
21st-century American women